Frank Converse (born May 22, 1938) is an American actor.

Early life 
Converse was born in 1938 in St. Louis, Missouri. In 1962, he received a Bachelor of Fine Arts in drama at Carnegie Institute of Technology (now Carnegie Mellon University) in Pittsburgh, Pennsylvania.

Career 
On Broadway, he starred in The Philadelphia Story (1980), Design for Living (1984), A Streetcar Named Desire (1988), and Lady in the Dark (1994). Off-Broadway, he starred in The House of Blue Leaves (1971) and South Pacific. In 2007, he appeared at the Hartford Stage in Thornton Wilder's Our Town with Hal Holbrook. Converse also did television commercials for Black & Decker in the late 1980s.

Converse was the star of five television series: Coronet Blue, N.Y.P.D. (not to be confused with NYPD Blue), Movin' On, The Family Tree, and Dolphin Cove. He played Harry O'Neill on One Life to Live and Ned Simon on As the World Turns, and he had a brief role in All My Children. He appeared opposite Bing Crosby in the 1971 TV movie thriller Dr. Cook's Garden, and played Morgan Harris in Anne of Green Gables: The Sequel (also known as Anne of Avonlea). He starred in the Tales of the Unexpected (TV series) as Jack in "Bird of Prey" (1984, series 7, episode 10). He also played Bill Davenport on an episode of Law & Order: Criminal Intent titled "Tomorrow".

His film career included roles in Hurry Sundown (1967), Hour of the Gun (1967, as Virgil Earp), The Rowdyman (1972), Killer on Board (1977), Cruise Into Terror (1978), The Pilot (1980), The Bushido Blade (1981), Spring Fever (1982), Solarbabies (1986), Everybody Wins (1990)  and Primary Motive (1992).

Personal life 
Divorced from Carol Tauser, then Astrid Ronning, he is currently married to actress Maureen Anderman.

Filmography

References

External links
 

1938 births
American male film actors
American male television actors
American male stage actors
Carnegie Mellon University College of Fine Arts alumni
Living people
Male actors from St. Louis
People from Delaware County, Pennsylvania